Movahed (Persian: موحد) is an Arabic name that may refer to
Abdollah Movahed (born 1940), Iranian wrestler
Bahar Movahed Bashiri (born 1979), Iranian portrait caricaturist and classical vocalist
Seyyed Mohammad Bagher Movahed Abtahi (1928–2014), Iranian religious leader
Ziya Movahed, Iranian poet and philosopher